Nandamuri Lakshmi Parvathi is an Indian politician and widow of N. T. Rama Rao. She was previously married to a harikatha artist Veeragandham Venkata Subba Rao. Later, she was separated from him and started living together with N. T. Rama Rao who officially married her in 1993.

Education

Lakshmi Parvathi completed her education in Telugu Literature from Telugu University of Telangana in the year 2000.

Political career

She has been active in politics after marrying NTR. Immediately after the demise of N. T. Rama Rao, she founded NTR Telugu Desam Party in 1995 by elections. Lakshmi Parvathi won as MLA from Pathapatnam (Assembly constituency) on behalf of NTRTDP with the support of Bharatiya Janata Party. 42 constituencies candidates were launched by NTR (TDP) in 1996. Even after winning 3,249,267 votes in the elections the party did not win a single seat. She later joined Indian National Congress party. Currently, she is a member of YSR Congress Party.

She contested from Sompeta and Eluru constituencies for the elections to the Andhra Pradesh assembly in 1999. She lost both the seats. She polled a mere 1,500 votes in Eluru.

Later life
Parvathi has been the incumbent chair of Telugu Academy since her appointment on 6 November 2019. She made her acting debut in the 2021 film Radhakrishna, which was about the traditional handicraft of Koyya dolls (Koyya Bommalu).

References 

Living people
Women in Andhra Pradesh politics
YSR Congress Party politicians
Telugu women writers
Telugu writers
Telugu Desam Party politicians
20th-century Indian women writers
20th-century Indian writers
Women writers from Andhra Pradesh
20th-century Indian women politicians
20th-century Indian politicians
Year of birth missing (living people)
Indian National Congress politicians